Nuno Álvares Pereira de Melo, 1st Duke of Cadaval, 4th Marquis of Ferreira, 5th Count of Tentúgal (4 November 1638 - 29 January 1725), was a Portuguese nobleman and statesman.

Life 
Nuno was a general in the Portuguese Restoration War, which earned him prestige and achieved himself the title of Duke of Cadaval. Following the end of the war, he was made Constable of Portugal in the Portuguese Cortes of 1668.

In June 1670, Nuno became a member of the Ultramarine Council, an administrative organ of the Portuguese Empire.

In 1707, the Duke was made chief of the Portuguese army.

He first married Marie Angélique, daughter of François Louis, Count of Harcourt, but she died in childbirth. He married secondly Marguerite of Lorraine (17 November 1662 – 16 December 1730), daughter of Louis, Count of Armagnac. He was grandfather to Leonor Tomásia de Távora, 3rd Marquise of Távora.

Ancestry

1638 births
1725 deaths
101
Constables of Portugal
Portuguese nobility